The Financial District is the central business district of Downtown Toronto, Ontario, Canada. It was originally planned as New Town in 1796 as an extension of the Town of York (later the St. Lawrence Ward). It is the main financial district in Toronto and is considered the heart of Canada's finance industry. It is bounded roughly by Queen Street West to the north, Yonge Street to the east, Front Street to the south, and University Avenue to the west, though many office towers in the downtown core have been and are being constructed outside this area, which will extend the general boundaries. Examples of this trend are the Telus Harbour, RBC Centre, and CIBC Square.

It is the most densely built-up area of Toronto, home to banking companies, corporate headquarters, high-powered legal and accounting firms, insurance companies and stockbrokers. In turn, the presence of so many decision-makers has brought advertising agencies and marketing companies. The banks have built large office towers, much of whose space is leased to these companies.

The bank towers and much else in Toronto's core are connected by a system of underground walkways, known as PATH, which is lined with retail establishments making the area one of Toronto's most important shopping districts. The vast majority of these stores are only open during weekdays during the business day when the financial district is populated. During the evenings and weekends, the walkways remain open but the area is almost deserted and most of the stores are closed.

It is estimated 100,000 commuters enter and leave the financial district each working day. Transport links are centred on Union Station at the south end of the financial district, which is the hub of the GO Transit system that provides commuter rail and bus links to Toronto's suburbs.

History
The district's origins date back to the mid to late-19th century when several early banks had head offices located in Toronto. Most of these banks were regional and came and went. It was not until the second half of the 20th century that the district became a centre for the Big Five Canadian banks. 

Of the Big Five banks, only CIBC and Toronto-Dominion Bank (including the banks existing before mergers) had full head offices in Toronto:
Among the Big Five banks, two of them were established in Toronto, the Canadian Imperial Bank of Commerce (CIBC), and Toronto-Dominion Bank (TD). CIBC was established in 1961 with the merger of two Toronto-based banks, the Canadian Bank of Commerce and the Imperial Bank of Canada; whereas TD was established in 1955 with the merger of two other Toronto-based banks, the Bank of Toronto and The Dominion Bank.

The other three Big Five banks were established outside of Ontario during the 19th century, and moved their headquarters to Toronto in the 20th century. Two of the banks, the Royal Bank of Canada (RBC) and Scotiabank, were established in Halifax. Scotiabank relocated to Toronto in 1931, while RBC relocated its head office to Montreal in 1907, and later to Toronto in 1976. The Bank of Montreal (BMO) was also established in Montreal, although the bank relocated its head offices to Toronto in 1975. While First Canadian Place in Toronto serves as BMO's operational headquarters or "executive offices," its legal head office remains in Montreal. Similarly, Royal Bank Plaza maintains two headquarters in Montreal and Toronto, with RBC referring to Royal Bank Plaza in Toronto as its "corporate headquarters".

In addition to major financial institutions, several Toronto-based law firms, most notably the Seven Sisters, have also based their offices in the Financial District.

The Toronto Financial District Business Improvement Area was later retained order to represent all commercial businesses within the district. The organization engages in streetscape improvements, addressing key issues that impact the area, and promoting the area's businesses online.

With much business activity and demand, there are new residential and condominium/towers built inside and around the edges, many of them are connected to the PATH system. In the southeast of the financial district, a new tunnel is under construction from Union Station to connect to Backstage Condo on Yonge and The-Esplanade.

Lost historic buildings

Developments during the mid-20th century led to the demolition of several 19th and 20th Century buildings including:
 Old Toronto Star Building - First Canadian Place
 retained various facades of 19th-century buildings along Yonge Street - Brookfield Place
 Bank of Toronto head office - Toronto-Dominion Centre
 The Dominion Bank head office - Commerce Court West tower

Notable landmarks

Buildings 200m+

Other major skyscrapers and complexes in the financial district include:

Exchange Tower
Fairmont Royal York
One King West
RBC Centre
Ritz-Carlton Toronto
Sun Life Centre
Telus Tower

Diplomatic and economic missions 

 Consulate of Mexico
 Consulate-General of Republic of Korea — Commercial Section (KOTRA)
 Consulate-General of Japan
 Consulate of Malaysia
 Consulate-General of Dominican Republic
 Taipei Economic and Cultural Representative Office

References

External links

Bay Street Corridor neighbourhood profile

Neighbourhoods in Toronto
PATH (Toronto)
Toronto
Toronto
Economy of Toronto